The Elephant in a China Shop is a 1958 West German comedy film directed by Heinz Paul and starring Carl Wery, Mara Lane and Dietmar Schönherr.

The film's sets were designed by the art director Max Seefelder.

Cast
 Carl Wery as Theodor Tanner, genannt TT
 Mara Lane as Ilona
 Dietmar Schönherr as Clemens, der Diener
 Rudolf Vogel as Diener
 Loni Heuser as Bessi, Wirtschafterin
 Paula Braend as Gefängniswärterin
 Johnny Cox as Tante Rosina
 Robert Fackler as Gefängniswärter Bemme

References

Bibliography 
 Harris M. Lentz. Obituaries in the Performing Arts, 2014. McFarland, 2015.

External links 
 

1958 films
1958 comedy films
German comedy films
West German films
1950s German-language films
Films directed by Heinz Paul
1950s German films